Allan Macy Butler (1894–1986) was an American pediatrician and Chief of the Children's Medical Services at Massachusetts General Hospital and a professor of Pediatrics at Harvard Medical School. A pioneer in health services, Butler sought to change the structure of the American ‘fee-for-service’ system of health care to one based on government-paid medical care for the elderly and low-income people.

Butler was born April 3, 1894, in Yonkers, New York. The son of George Prentice Butler, a stockbroker, he was one of eight children. Butler spent World War I overseas, serving as an artillery officer in the American Expeditionary Forces. Afterward,  he served in Poland as part of the Hoover Commission. Butler entered Harvard Medical School in 1922.  After graduating in 1926, he worked at the Rockefeller Institute. It was there that he developed an interest in fluid and electrolyte metabolism. During World War II, he worked on life-raft studies conducted by the Office of Scientific Research and Development that led to advancements in treating diarrhea and dehydration.

In 1929, Butler returned to Harvard as an instructor in Pediatrics. He attained the title of Professor of Pediatrics in 1944 and served as Chief of Children's Medical Service and Staff Physician in charge of the Chemical Laboratories at Massachusetts General Hospital. He would remain at these two posts, concurrently, until 1960.

Butler's advocacy for medical insurance and pre-paid methods of health care embroiled him in the socialized medicine debate. He would also face a loyalty review by the Civil Service Commission Loyalty Review Board. After his trial he provided support in the form of testimony 
and letters for colleagues who were being tried under the Subversive Activities Control Act of 1950.

He was a dedicated opponent of the Vietnam War and a supporter of abortion rights, nuclear disarmament, and nonviolent resistance.

In 1969 Butler received the American Pediatric Society's highest award, the John Howland Award.

References

Further reading
 Allan Macy Butler Papers, 1916-1986(inclusive), 1930-1969(bulk), HMS c313. Harvard Medical Library, Francis A. Countway Library of Medicine,Center for the History of Medicine, Harvard Medical School.
 Digitized Images from the Allan Macy Butler Papers

1894 births
1986 deaths
American hospital administrators
American pediatricians
Harvard Medical School alumni
Harvard Medical School faculty
Healthcare reform in the United States
People from Yonkers, New York
Physicians of Massachusetts General Hospital
Victims of McCarthyism